Girma Bèyènè, born in Addis Ababa, is an Ethiopian lyricist, composer, arranger, vocalist, and pianist, most active during the golden era of Ethiopian vinyl records (1969–78). He only recorded four songs as a vocalist, but arranged more than 60 titles, and collaborated on at least 25 other tracks. Girma left Ethiopia during the Derg military dictatorship to live in the United States, where he disappeared into the diaspora and ceased to play music. He released a new album in 2017, part of the Ethiopiques collection.

Discography
Contributing artist
 Éthiopiques Volume 8: Swinging Addis (2000, Buda Musique)
 The Rough Guide to the Music of Ethiopia (2004, World Music Network)
 Éthiopiques Volume 22: Alèmayèhu Eshèté, featuring Girma Bèyènè (2007, Buda Musique)

Lead artist
 Éthiopiques Volume 30: "Mistakes On Purpose", Girma Bèyènè & Akalé Wubé (2017, Buda Musique)

References

External links
 "Girma Bèyènè - Biography", Last.fm
 
 

Ethiopian music arrangers
Living people
People from Addis Ababa
Year of birth missing (living people)